Chatuchak Park station is a Bangkok MRT station on the Blue Line. It is located under the southern part of Chatuchak Park. It is an important interchange station of northern Bangkok because passengers can connect to BTS Sukhumvit Line at Mo Chit station and inter-city buses at Bangkok bus station. The symbol color, which is decorated on the pillars, is  blue.

References 

MRT (Bangkok) stations
Railway stations opened in 2004
2004 establishments in Thailand